Cerace malayana is a species of moth of the family Tortricidae. It is found on Peninsular Malaysia.

The wingspan is about 44.5 mm. The forewings are black on the costal half and purplish black turning black ferruginous on dorsal half. The hindwings are white, faintly touched with yellowish and sparsely strewn with black scales.

References

Moths described in 1970
Ceracini